is a passenger railway station located in the city of Toda, Saitama, Japan, operated by the East Japan Railway Company (JR East).

Lines
Some trains continue northward to  via the Kawagoe Line and southward to  via the TWR Rinkai Line. The station is located 11.0 km north of Ikebukuro Station. The station identification colour is sky blue.

Station layout
The station consists of one elevated island platform serving two tracks, with the station building underneath. Additional passing tracks lie on either side of the station for non-stop rapid services. The tracks of the Tōhoku Shinkansen also run adjacent to this station, on the west side.

The station has a "Midori no Madoguchi" staffed ticket office.

Platforms

An arrangement of the Toda City song has been used as the departure melody for trains departing from the up platform (platform 1) since 1 August 2007.

History
Toda-kōen Station opened on 30 September 1985.

Passenger statistics
In fiscal 2019, the station was used by an average of 34,478 passengers daily (boarding passengers only). The passenger figures for previous years are as shown below.

Surrounding area
 Arakawa River
 Toda Park, after which the station is named
 Boat Race Toda boat racing circuit
 Toda Rowing Course
 Toda Chuo General Hospital

See also
List of railway stations in Japan

References

External links

 Toda-Kōen Station information (JR East) 

Saikyō Line
Stations of East Japan Railway Company
Railway stations in Saitama Prefecture
Railway stations in Japan opened in 1985
Toda, Saitama